Nightmare Anatomy is the second studio album by American rock band Aiden, released on October 4, 2005 by record label Victory. It was produced by Steve Carter.

Background

In 2009, speaking to Kerrang!, Francis commented:For Nightmare... I'd learnt how to write and arrange things better than I'd done on Our Gang. Nightmare is a lot more focused on structure; verse, chorus, verse, chorus. I know that a lot of people like Nightmare Anatomy and I think it's a great record for where we were at as a band then. It's a hard-hitting, in your face punk rock album and that was the album we wanted to make at the time.

Release
In July and August 2005, the group supported The Hurt Process on their New Faces from Different Places tour. It was released on October 4 through record label Victory. It was supported by three singles: "Knife Blood Nightmare", "The Last Sunrise", and "Die Romantic". The Japan release also contains a bonus DVD with interviews, music video, and other material.

October through December 2005 the band played the opening slot on the Never Sleep again tour with Silverstein, Bayside, and Hawthorne Heights.

In March and April 2006, the group supported Thirty Seconds to Mars on the Forever Night Never Day tour. In May and June, the band supported HIM on their tour of the U.S. The band went on the 2006 edition of the Warped Tour. In October and November, the band supported Silverstein in their Never Shave Again Tour in the US.

For Aiden's final tour in the fall of 2015, they played Nightmare Anatomy in its entirety.

Reception

The album peaked at number 196 on the Billboard 200, number 9 on the Billboard Heatseekers Chart, and number 16 on the Billboard Independent Albums Chart, selling over 89,000 copies. The album has received a mixed-to-negative reaction from music critics.

Track listing

Personnel

Aiden
 Wil Francis – lead vocals
 Angel Ibarra – lead guitar, backing vocals
 Jake Wambold – rhythm guitar, backing vocals
 Nick Wiggins – bass guitar, backing vocals
 Jake Davison – drums, backing vocals

Production and additional personnel
 Steve Carter – production, engineer, mixing
 Justin Armstrong – engineer
 Paul Speer – mixing, mastering 
 Gregg Keplinger – drum technician
 Aaron Edge – layout, design, backing vocals
 Brian "Spicoli" Johnson – backing vocals
 Salo – photography
 Misha Hunting – band photography

References

External links
 Nightmare Anatomy on Victory Records

Aiden albums
2005 albums
Victory Records albums